Bay City may refer to:

Places

Australia
 Westfield Bay City, a shopping centre in Geelong, Victoria

Philippines
 Bay City, Metro Manila, the reclamation area of Metro Manila in the Philippines

United States
 Bay City, Pope County, Illinois
 Bay City, Michigan
 Bay City Town Center, a shopping mall in Bay City, Michigan
 Bay City, Oregon
 Bay City, Texas
 Bay City, Washington
 Bay City, Wisconsin
 a nickname for San Francisco
 a nickname for Santa Monica, California

Canada
 a nickname for Hamilton, Ontario

Fictional
 Bay City (TV series), a 1993 Australian children's television series set in Bay City
 Bay City, a fictional midwestern town in the NBC soap Another World
 Bay City, a fictional town in the American television series Cobra
 Bay City, a place visited by Crypto in Destroy All Humans! 2, a parody of San Francisco
 Bay City, California, a community in the 1970s Starsky & Hutch television series and film
 Bay City, California, a community mentioned in "Exit Prentiss Carr", the sixth episode of the first season of The Rockford Files 
 Bay City, California, the location of the team in the 1970s minor-league baseball-themed series Bay City Blues
 Bay City, a megalopolis developed over historic San Francisco in the Netflix series Altered Carbon
 Bay City, a fictional town in the television series Renegade
 Bay City, California, a pseudonym used by Raymond Chandler in several short stories and novels; see Raymond Chandler bibliography

Other uses
 Bay City (album), by David Thomas 
 Bay City Rollers, Scottish pop band
 黄昏のBay City, Album by Junko Yagami (Containing a song by the same name)
 Bay City Romance, Song by Miki Matsubara